{{DISPLAYTITLE:C19H22N2O}}
The molecular formula C19H22N2O may refer to:

 Amedalin
 Cinchonidine
 Cinchonine
 Ketipramine
 Normacusine B
 Noxiptiline
 Rhazinilam
 Tombozine
 Vinburnine (Eburnamonine)